Montgomery is a town in the far northwestern portion of Grant Parish, which is located in north-central Louisiana, United States. The population of Montgomery was 726 at the 2010 census. The town has a poverty rate of 37 percent and a median household income of just under $22,000. The median age is just under forty; the population in 2010 was 78 percent white.

Montgomery is part of the Alexandria Metropolitan Statistical Area though it is forty miles north of Alexandria. Founded in 1712, even before New Orleans, Montgomery is situated on U.S. Route 71, close to the boundary with Natchitoches and Winn parishes. It is located on the eastern bank of the Red River.

Geography

According to the United States Census Bureau, the town has a total area of 2.1 square miles (5.4 km), all land.

Demographics

2020 census

As of the 2020 United States census, there were 622 people, 261 households, and 114 families residing in the town.

2000 census
As of the census of 2000, there were 787 people, 332 households, and 210 families residing in the town. The racial makeup of the town was 77.00% White, 20.33% African American, 0.25% Native American, 0.13% from other races, and 2.29% from two or more races. Hispanic or Latino of any race were 0.38% of the population.

There were 332 households, out of which 28.0% had children under the age of 18 living with them, 44.9% were married couples living together, 14.2% had a female householder with no husband present, and 36.7% were non-families. Nearly 32.5% of all households were made up of individuals, and 18.1% had someone living alone who was 65 years of age or older. The average household size was 2.37, and the average family size was 3.03.

In the town, the population was spread out, with 26.9% under the age of 18, 8.5% from 18 to 24, 25.2% from 25 to 44, 21.3% from 45 to 64, and 18.0% who were 65 years of age or older. The median age was 38 years. For every 100 females, there were 98.2 males. For every 100 females age 18 and over, there were 90.4 males.

The median income for a household in the town was $18,462, and the median income for a family was $23,558. Males had a median income of $28,125 versus $17,083 for females. The per capita income for the town was $11,533. About 34.0% of families and 39.6% of the population were below the poverty line, including 49.8% of those under age 18 and 32.3% of those age 65 or over.

Community life
Montgomery-area churches include First Baptist, Northside Baptist, and Hargis Baptist, all Southern Baptist in affiliation, Pleasant Hill Baptist Church, Mount Vernon Baptist Church, St. Luke A.M.E. ( African Methodist Episcopal) Church, St. Patrick's Roman Catholic Church, a United Methodist Church, and a Pentecostal congregation. Northside was located on the main highway during the 1990s. The new church building burned and was rebuilt on the same site at 330 Bienville Street. Hargis Church is located in the Hargis community east of Montgomery.

Businesses in Montgomery include My Salon, Kornbread Korner, The Mustard Seed, McManus Auto, Vernie J's Hardware, Dollar General, Montgomery Pharmacy, Sabine Bank, and BOM Bank.  

Local education is provided by Montgomery High School.  Montgomery High School is a combination school consisting of grades six through twelve.  The current enrollment (as of 2022) is approximately 241 students.  The current principal of Montgomery High School is Mr. Michael Edwards.  The school offers a variety of sports programs including football, basketball (girls and boys), baseball, softball, and track.  Clubs offered at the school include BETA, Student Council, 4-H, Fellowship of Christian Athletes, and Healthy Living Club.  

When not working or attending a school-sponsored function, most residents can be found at one of the five churches in Montgomery.  Spiritual growth is considered an essential part of Montgomery life.  

The school is the primary focus of the community with academic and sporting events being the center of most activities.  It is not uncommon to see deserted streets, businesses closed, and front porch lights turned off as most of the town heads to the local football or basketball game.  Known for their passion and spirit, Montgomery residents pride themselves on "doing more with less" and "never giving up".  Despite their small numbers, Montgomery High School competes regularly in the playoffs for all sports.  In 2022, Montgomery High School won its first State Championship in the sport of softball.  Coaches Paige Grayson, Jason Graves, and Laryn Graves led their team to a 31-1 season capping it off with a State Title.  Currently, Montgomery High School maintains a School Performance Score of "B" by the state of Louisiana.

Silman shooting spree

Notable people
 A. Leonard Allen, late U.S. representative, once taught school in the Verda community east of Montgomery.
 Jesse C. Deen, state representative from 1972 to 1988, lived in Hargis and went to Montgomery High SChool.

References

Towns in Grant Parish, Louisiana
Towns in Louisiana
Alexandria metropolitan area, Louisiana